Thierry Tidrow (born 29 September 1986) is a Franco-Ontarian composer. He currently lives in Cologne, Germany.

In 2014, he was awarded the Jules-Léger Prize for New Chamber Music, for his work, Au found du Cloître humide, commissioned by Continuum Contemporary Music (Toronto). In the same year he also received first prize at the SOCAN awards for his piece Violon et clarinette, and third prize for his opera Less Truth More Telling.

In 2015, the Akademie der Künste der Welt in Cologne commissioned his Manifeste Assi, for clarinet, flute, cello and reciter, based on texts by Natasha Kanapé Fontaine and Joséphine Bacon. This work was premiered in Cologne by Liz Hirst, Heather Roche and Niklas Seidl, with Tidrow and Fontaine reciting.

In 2016, the New Talents Biennale Cologne commissioned his work, Styroporös for ensemble hand werk. He was also a fellow at Heidelberger Frühling and his piece based on texts from Das Knaben Wunderhorn, Die alten, bösen Lieder was commissioned by the festival for Sarah Maria Sun and Johannes Fischer.

Works 
 STYROPORÖS (2016) violin, cello, clarinet, flute and bowed polystyrene [8′]
  Die alten, bösen Lieder (2016) (mezzo-)soprano and percussion [9′]
 At the still point (2016) two recorders and voice [9′]
 Manifeste Assi (2015)  for reciter and cello, bass clarinet and bass flute [55′]
 Et tu m’as nommée nouveau monde (2015) cello, bass clarinet, bass flute [8′]
 So be it (2015) saxophone quartet [10′]
 Clarintabile (2014) clarinet and voice [12′]
 Ricercar (2014) baroque violin [9′]
 Au fond du cloître humide (2014) flute, clarinet, violin, cello, piano and percussion [12′]
 LUFT-1098 (2015)  flute, oboe, clarinet, violin, cello, harp and synthesizer [9′]
 Virelai (2013) recorder, alto flute, violin, viola, cello and trombone [9′]
 Chanson (2012) string quartet [14′]
 Fribourgeoiseries (2012) violin, violoncello, flute, clarinet, piano, harp, lupophone, contraforte [12′]
  (2011) [7′]
 Affectations romanesques (2011) viola, violoncello, trumpet, clarinet, oboe, piano, percussion [7′]
 Unlock’d her Silent Throat (2008) horn, electric guitar, piano, two percussion, string quartet [12′]

References

External links
 

1986 births
Living people
Canadian male composers
Franco-Ontarian people
Jules Léger Prize for New Chamber Music winners
Canadian classical composers